Brigadier Cedric Rupert Vaughan Edgar,  (9 July 1901 – 2 September 1967) was an officer in the Australian Army during the Second World War.

References

 

1901 births
1967 deaths
Military personnel from Victoria (Australia)
Australian bankers
Australian brigadiers
Australian Commanders of the Order of the British Empire
Australian Companions of the Distinguished Service Order
Australian Army personnel of World War II